Machelen is a municipality located in the Belgian province of Flemish Brabant. The municipality comprises the towns of Diegem and Machelen proper. On 1 January 2006 Machelen had a total population of 12,500. The total area is 11.59 km2 which gives a population density of 1,078 inhabitants per km2.

Machelen may have been the birthplace of composer Cypriano de Rore.

A portion of Brussels Airport is located in Diegem, Machelen.

Economy

Brussels Airlines has its corporate headquarters in the b.house on the grounds of Brussels Airport and in Diegem, Machelen. Brussels Airlines formed in 2006 as a result of a merger between SN Brussels and Virgin Express.

The Europe, Middle East, and Africa operations of Chevron Phillips are based in Stockholm Building in Airport Plaza in Diegem.

Education
Primary schools include:
 Gemeentelijke Basisschool De Fonkel (Diegem)
 Basisschool De Sterrenhemel
 Vrije Basisschool De Windroos
 Parochiale Basisschool (Diegem)

GISO Machelen provides secondary education.

Bibliotheek Machelen-Diegem is the public library of the town.

References

External links
 
Official website – Only available in Dutch
 http://www.uplace.eu/en/category/uplace-machelen-en/

 
Municipalities of Flemish Brabant